(), also known as inherited glyphs form, or traditional glyph form (not to be confused with Traditional Chinese), is a traditional printing orthography form of Chinese character which uses the orthodox forms, mainly referring to the traditional Chinese character glyphs, especially the printed forms after movable type printing.  was formed in the Ming Dynasty, and is also known as Kyūjitai in Japan. It also refers to the characters used in China before the Chinese writing reform and the issuing of the 1964 List of Character Forms of Common Chinese characters for Publishing.

Broadly speaking,  also refers to the character forms used in printing Chinese before reformation by national stardardization, e.g. xin zixing in mainland China, Standard Form of National Characters in Taiwan, and List of Graphemes of Commonly-Used Chinese Characters in Hong Kong.  is generally the opposite form of the standards. The representative books that used  include Kangxi Dictionary, Zhongwen Da Cidian, Dai Kan-Wa Jiten, Chinese-Korean Dictionary, and Zhonghua Da Zidian.

There are several standards of  developed by scholars before, but there is no single enforced standard. Variations of  standard can be see in Kangxi Dictionary, Old Chinese printing form, Korean Hanja, some printing forms in Taiwan, and MingLiU in Windows 98 and earlier versions; slight differences may occur between different  standards. Currently there are also open-sourced communities that develop and maintain modern  standards that are based on and/or unify other  forms from academic research.

Origin 

During the woodblock printing era, words were usually carved in handwritten form (regular script) as each woodblock is different, making the work to produce each printed book tedious. The development of wooden movable type during the Song dynasty caused the Chinese characters to take on a more rectangular form following the wood texture. Vertical strokes were thickened to reduce engraving loss, while a small triangle was added at the end of horizontal strokes and the start of vertical strokes to improve the legibility of text even after the pieces are worn out by long-term use. As the character styles started to differ widely from regular script, the calligraphic methods used on regular scripts could not be used on movable type characters and a new distinctive style designated for movable type was born. This style was developed fully during the Ming dynasty, which has now evolved into Ming typefaces.

Comparing movable type and woodblock styles, it can be noticed that movable type characters – which are the basis of  today – are different from the random and changing nature of handwritten regular script, and emphasize clear strokes and the beautiful, symmetric structure of characters. Movable type characters also emphasize the philology aspects of Chinese characters more so than regular script.

Characteristics 
The nomenclature for strokes here uses the inherited name.

From appearance 
It is hard to achieve this stable form following  standards.
 No prevention of heavy press strokes: When two or more presses (，) appear in a single character, keep both presses instead of changing one of the presses to a dot (/，).
 Start of press: Some  standards add an extra stroke at the start of a press, for example an upward horizontal stroke (，) before a press (such as ) or a horizontal stroke (，㇐) before a press (such as).
 · : The last stroke is a dot-upward horizontal stroke (，).
: First stroke is a throw-dot stroke (，㇛), not a throw-upward horizontal stroke (，㇜).
: The bottom should be a shape of 𡭔 intimating silk-like coil, not  or three dots.
: The first stroke is a wilted dot (or vertical dot, ，).
: The last stroke is a horizontal stroke.

From philology 
Etymologically, the first stroke comes from the shape of a person's head or the top of a building.

Classifications

Kangxi Dictionary 
In Taiwan it can generally mean . This name may also refer to the computer font TypeLand .

Example font 
 TypeLand 康熙字典體
 文悦古典明朝体
 文悦古体仿宋（聚珍仿宋）
 浙江民間書刻體
 汲古書體

Standard printing characters in Korea 

in Japan 
This is the character form used before Japan released the JIS X 0218 standard (later expanded to JIS X 2013). Some characters have two or more forms listed.

Checklist of Inherited Glyphs 
The Checklist of Inherited Glyphs is an open-source public orthography standard compiled and released by the civil open-source organization Ichitenfont. The standard and its annex are available for all font foundries to reference and follow. The checklist standard is made with philology research and strikes a balance between philological research, orthographical theory, current usage, and aesthetics. Mixed components in current standards are separated and normalized to different character forms, and the most representative inherited character form is chosen as the recommended form. The standard also includes other orthographical forms seen in everyday life which also have a legitimate philological source, providing font foundries more options to adjust and adapt character forms that follow philological sources.

Example fonts 
I.Ming (I., also known as ), modified and extended from IPAmj Mincho
 Hong Kong Character Set Project traditional orthography version

Other amorphous  orthography standards

Character forms before the Chinese Character Reformation 
Before the Chinese Character Reformation, normal printing presses used  as the character standard.

Current-generation amorphous standards 

Licensed fonts 
 Taiwanese font foundries
 Arphic Technology
 
 
 
 
 DynaComware
  (Except /W3)
  (Version 5.03 and later follows the Standard Form of National Characters）
 
 
 Chinese font foundries
 FounderType
 
 
 
 
 
 
 Korean font foundries
 New Batang
 New Gulim
 New Gungsuh (This standard script font follows , which may have some character forms out of place compared to other regular script fonts, such as  having two dots)
 Japanese font foundries

Modified fonts 
  (Old name: Zauri Sans／; merged and modified from /)
  (modified from /)
  (Modified from )
  (Modified from Korean New Batang)
  (Modified from )
  (Modified from )
  (Modified from )

Notes

References

See also 
 xin zixing
 Ming/Song typeface
 Traditional Chinese characters

External links 
 Checklist of Inherited Glyphs
 Habitat - Hanzi Old Styles
 I.Ming font
Hong Kong Character Set Project

Chinese characters